Charter Oak Township is a township in Crawford County, Iowa, USA.  As of the 2010 census, its population was 704.

Geography
According to the USGS, it contains four cemeteries: Charter Oak, Saint Boniface, Saint John and Saint Paul.

The stream of Emigrant Creek runs through this township.

References
 USGS Geographic Names Information System (GNIS)

External links
 US-Counties.com
 City-Data.com
 https://web.archive.org/web/20161019182931/https://www.census.gov/popest/data/cities/totals/2015/SUB-EST2015-3.html

Townships in Crawford County, Iowa
Townships in Iowa